It's Still Like a Secret is the fourth studio album by Los Angeles-based post-rock duo El Ten Eleven. The album was sold at shows during their fall 2010 tour and officially released on 9 November. The album's title is a reference to Built to Spill's 1999 album Keep It Like a Secret.

Music videos
The band released music videos for two of the songs on the album: "Falling" and "The Sycophants Are Coming! The Sycophants Are Coming!"

Track listing
 "Ya No" – 1:49
 "The Sycophants Are Coming! The Sycophants Are Coming!" – 3:13
 "Indian Winter" – 4:41
 "Falling" – 3:11
 "Triangle Face" – 4:12
 "Ian Mackaye Was Right" – 4:16
 "Marriage Is the New Going Steady" – 3:34
 "Cease and Persist" – 3:45
 "Anxiety Is Cheap" – 4:03
 "Settling With Power" – 3:02
 "83" – 1:58
 "Tomorrow Is an Excuse for Today" – 3:52

References

2010 albums
El Ten Eleven albums